The 1998 Open Gaz de France was a women's tennis tournament played onindoor  carpet courts at the Stade Pierre de Coubertin in Paris, France, that was part of Tier II of the 1998 WTA Tour. It was the sixth edition of the tournament and was held from 9 February until 15 February 1998. Mary Pierce won the singles title.

Finals

Singles

 Mary Pierce defeated  Dominique Van Roost 6–3, 7–5
 It was Pierce's 1st title of the year and the 12th of her career.

Doubles

 Sabine Appelmans /  Miriam Oremans defeated  Anna Kournikova /  Larisa Savchenko 1–6, 6–3, 7–6
 It was Appelmans' 1st title of the year and the 9th of her career. It was Oremans' 1st title of the year and the 2nd of her career.

External links
 WTA Tournament Profile

Open Gaz de France
Open GDF Suez
Open Gaz de France
Open Gaz de France
Open Gaz de France